Joseph Patrick Kennedy II (born September 24, 1952) is an American businessman, Democratic politician, and a member of the Kennedy family. He is a son of former United States Senator Robert F. Kennedy and Ethel Kennedy, and he is also a nephew of former U.S. President John F. Kennedy.

He served as a member of the United States House of Representatives from the 8th congressional district of Massachusetts from 1987 to 1999. In 1979 he founded and, until he was elected to the U.S. House, led Citizens Energy Corporation, a non-profit energy company which provides heating oil to low-income and elderly families in Massachusetts. Since 1999, Kennedy has continued to lead Citizens Energy, which has now become a leader in green energy development.

Early life, education, and early business career
Joseph Patrick Kennedy II (also better known as Joe) was born on September 24, 1952 in St. Elizabeth's Hospital in the Brighton section of Boston, Massachusetts, the second of 11 children of Ethel (Skakel) and Robert Francis Kennedy. He was named after his grandfather Joseph P. Kennedy Sr., the patriarch of the Kennedy family. He had a troubled youth and was expelled from several private schools as a result of his quick temper. He regularly got into fights with his younger brothers and male cousins. He was 15 when his father was assassinated. A restless, impulsive teenager, he left Milton Academy, a private, college preparatory school, in Milton, Massachusetts, later graduating from the Manter Hall School—also a private, college-preparatory school—in Cambridge, Massachusetts, in 1971. During his time at Milton, he was roommates with Thomas C. Wales.

Kennedy attended the University of California, Berkeley, in Berkeley, California, during 1972 but dropped out. After this he worked for several months as part of a federally funded program to combat and treat tuberculosis in the African American community in San Francisco, California. San Francisco Mayor Joseph Alioto personally praised Kennedy's work in the community.  Kennedy resigned from his position in the program and returned to Massachusetts in the summer of 1973.

On February 22, 1972, Kennedy was on Lufthansa Flight 649 when it was hijacked. Shortly after the inflight movie began during the 747's flight from New Delhi to Athens, five gunmen seized the jet and forced it to land at Aden International Airport, where all hostages were released the following day.

In August 1973, a Jeep he was driving on Nantucket overturned, fracturing one of his brother David Kennedy's vertebrae and permanently paralyzing David's girlfriend, Pam Kelley. The police cited Kennedy with reckless driving and the judge temporarily suspended his driver's license. The Kennedy family paid for Kelley's initial medical treatment and minorly contributed to her continued care during the years following the accident. Kelley died on November 20, 2020, leaving behind among others, a 31-year-old daughter and two grandsons.

Kennedy returned to school after the accident and graduated with a Bachelor of Arts degree from the University of Massachusetts Boston in 1976.

In 1979 Kennedy founded Citizens Energy, a nonprofit organization, to provide discounted heating oil to low-income families. In 2010, Kennedy transformed the organization to become a leader in renewable energy generation while continuing to use profits to provide energy savings to low-income families.  (See Citizens Energy (since 1979) section below.)

U.S. House of Representatives (1987–99)

Elections
In 1986 incumbent Democrat and Speaker of the House Thomas Phillip "Tip" O'Neill Jr., who had held 8th Congressional district of Massachusetts seat since 1953, announced his retirement. Kennedy decided to run for the seat, which his uncle, former president John F. Kennedy, had held from 1947 to 1953. The Democratic nomination was contested by a number of well-known Democrats including state senator George Bachrach and state representative Mel King. However, Kennedy garnered endorsements from The Boston Globe and the retiring O'Neill. Kennedy won the primary with 53%. He won the general election with 72% of the vote. He won re-election in 1988 (80%), 1990 (72%), 1992 (83%), 1994 (99%), and 1996 (84%).

Tenure
Kennedy's legislative efforts in U.S. House of Representatives included

Expanding the availability of credit to working Americans to buy homes and to open businesses.
Requiring public disclosure of bank-lending practices in poorer neighborhoods and disclosure of bank home-mortgage approvals and refusals by race, sex, and income. Subsequent Federal Reserve Board studies based on these newly required disclosures found widespread evidence of discriminatory-loan practices. One study found that white borrowers in the lowest-income category were approved for mortgages more than African American borrowers in the highest-income category. Data from Boston; Chicago, Illinois; and Minneapolis, Minnesota found that African Americans were turned down at three times the rate of whites.
Helping create hundreds of thousands of new affordable-housing units nationwide by introducing tax credits to stimulate private investment in neighborhood housing developments after federal housing assistance had been cut by 75 percent during the 1980s.
Chairing the House Banking subcommittee on consumer credit and insurance and holding the first U.S. congressional hearings to expose the lack of access to insurance in low-income neighborhoods.
Proposing a balanced-budget amendment to the U.S. Constitution as a vehicle to end skyrocketing deficits, reduce interest rates, and free up investment capital for business growth rather than government bonds while fighting to end corporate tax breaks and subsidies.
Overhauling federal public-housing law for the first time in almost 60 years, giving local housing authorities the ability to raise standards while protecting those who depend on public housing for shelter.
Co-chairing the U.S. congressional biotechnology caucus and proposing to preserve and expand federal research and development accounts that stimulate the creation of new technologies and build the foundation for new jobs and business growth.
Proposing the "Mom and Pop Protection Act" to help corner-store owners to install safety equipment and a "National Stalker Reduction Act" to require all states to enact comprehensive anti-stalking legislation, track stalkers, and establish a national domestic-violence database to track violations of civil-protection orders.
Protecting kids from alcohol by proposing to limit television advertising of beer and wine between 7 a.m. and 10 p.m. and to keep outdoor alcohol advertisements away from schools.
Launching a bipartisan initiative in Massachusetts to fight child hunger that helped lead to an expansion of school breakfast and lunch programs.

In 1991 Kennedy boycotted a speech to the U.S. Congress by the United Kingdom's Queen Elizabeth II "in protest to the British occupation in Northern Ireland".

In March 1998, following a year of family troubles that included the skiing death of his brother Michael LeMoyne Kennedy, he announced that he planned to retire from the U.S. House, citing "a new recognition of our own vulnerabilities and the vagaries of life."  An editorial in The Boston Globe observed that "Kennedy has remained steadfast in his political life to issues and constituencies no poll would have led him to: the poor, the homeless, disadvantaged children, and others swamped in the current tide of prosperity." He served in the U.S. House for six terms, until January 1999. In his final speech on the U.S. House floor, Kennedy delivered "an impassioned plea for unity and forgiveness" in the midst of Congressional debate regarding the proposed articles of impeachment of President Bill Clinton.

Committee assignments
Throughout his career in the U.S. House, Kennedy served on the House Banking Committee, where he played an active role in the federal saving-and-loan bailout, credit-reporting reform, the overhaul of The Glass–Steagall Act of 1933 and financial modernization. Kennedy also served on the House Veterans' Affairs Committee, passing legislation to strengthen the veterans' health-care system, to investigate the causes of Gulf War syndrome, and to provide medical treatment for veterans of the Persian Gulf War.

Citizens Energy (since 1999)

Overview
After leaving the U.S. House, Kennedy returned to Citizens Energy. (During Kennedy's terms in the U.S. House, it had been run by his brother Michael.) Citizens Energy pursues commercial ventures aimed at generating revenues that, in turn, are used to generate funds that could assist those in need in the U.S. and abroad. It grew to encompass seven separate companies, including one of the largest energy-conservation firms in the U.S. Citizens Energy became one of the U.S.'s first energy firms to move large volumes of natural gas to more than thirty states. As a precursor to market changes under electricity deregulation in the late 1990s, Citizens Energy was a pioneer in moving and marketing electrical power over the power grid. In recent years, Kennedy has led the company into the renewable-energy industry, building solar farms along the East Coast and transmission lines to support charitable programs like one giving free solar panels to low-income families in California. In 2019, Citizens Energy announced the completion of one of the largest Low-Income Community Shared Solar projects in the country, funded by its investment in the Sunrise PowerLink Transmission line. Totaling 30 megawatts, the record-breaking California project will provide $500 in energy savings to 12,000 low-income families each year.

Public policy
Since 1979, Citizens Energy has provided affordable heating oil to low-income families in Massachusetts and other cold-weather states. These charitable efforts were funded largely from profitable commercial ventures and donations.

Since returning to Citizens Energy, Kennedy also has sought to influence energy-related public policy, challenging the Bush administration to invest in energy conservation and efficiency and renewable energy, encouraging Congress to fully fund federal heating assistance programs, proposing that oil-consuming countries work together to balance oil prices against Organization of Petroleum Exporting Countries (OPEC) manipulation, and calling for the federal government and major oil companies to use portions of royalties from oil and gas extracted from federal lands and waters to help low-income families with the high price of energy. Kennedy has been criticized for the salaries paid to himself and his wife. In 2012, as CEO of Citizens Energy and related organizations, Kennedy was paid a total of $796,000 in compensation, and his wife was paid an additional $344,000 as Director of Marketing.

Venezuela
Beginning in 2005, Citgo Petroleum Company (Citgo), a wholly owned subsidiary of Petróleos de Venezuela (PDVSA)—the Venezuelan state-owned oil company—has been the primary donor of heating oil to Citizens Energy. The Wall Street Journal and others criticized Citizens Energy for continuing its relationship with the Venezuelan government and Venezuelan president Hugo Chávez, a harsh critic of the United States. In response, Kennedy and others have argued that it is hypocritical to criticize a non-profit organization for accepting oil from Venezuela while numerous other American businesses are profiting from robust trade with Venezuela and at a time when the U.S. government has cut low-income fuel assistance.

Although Citgo donations reportedly dried up in 2015 owing to Venezuela's economic turmoil, the company was reported in 2009 to have donated 83 million gallons of oil  over the two previous years, which was used to provide heating assistance to an estimated 200,000 families a year in 23 states.

Kennedy has since turned into a critic of Venezuelan president Nicolás Maduro, the handpicked successor of Chávez, accusing him of "stealing democracy from the people" and calling for Maduro's removal.

Later political considerations

Gubernatorial elections
In 1993 a Boston Globe poll showed Kennedy within one percentage point of popular incumbent William Weld in a hypothetical gubernatorial match-up, prompting prominent state Democrats to try and recruit him for the race. Though no other Democrat was polling near Weld, Kennedy decided to forgo the race and remain in Congress. Mark Roosevelt won the nomination and lost to Governor Weld by over 40 points.

Kennedy was considered the front runner for the governorship of Massachusetts in 1998, but revelations about his personal life led to a tumultuous fall in public opinion polling, and he decided against running.
Kennedy explained in a VFW hall in a working-class corner of Boston that he believed he would never be able to focus his candidacy on issues: "The race will focus on personal or family questions. It is not fair to my family, it is not fair to the people of Massachusetts and it is not the right thing to do."

2010 U.S. Senate election 
With the death of his uncle U.S. senator Ted Kennedy on August 25, 2009, Kennedy's name had been mentioned as a possible candidate for his uncle's seat representing Massachusetts in the United States Senate. In an Associated Press article, Democratic strategist Dan Payne said, "He wouldn't be human and he wouldn't be a Kennedy if he didn't give serious consideration to running for what is known as the 'Kennedy seat' in Massachusetts." However, Kennedy released a statement on September 7 explaining that he would not pursue the seat. The seat eventually went by appointment to Paul G. Kirk and later by election to Republican Scott Brown.

Personal life
On February 3, 1979, Kennedy married Sheila Brewster Rauch (born March 22, 1949), a daughter of banker Rudolph Stewart "Stew" Rauch Jr., president then chairman of the Philadelphia Savings Fund Society, and Frances Stuart Brewster. On October 4, 1980, the couple had fraternal twin sons, Matthew Rauch "Matt" Kennedy and Joseph Patrick "Joe" Kennedy III. They were legally divorced in 1991.

His older son (by eight minutes), Matthew, and his wife Katherine became parents to a daughter, Lily Frances Kennedy in 2013; Matthew and Katherine then welcomed their second child, Charlotte Ethel Kennedy, in 
2016.  His younger son, Joseph III, and wife Lauren became parents to a daughter, Eleanor Anne Kennedy, in 2015, and a son in 2017, James Matthew Kennedy.
 
In 1993 Kennedy asked the Roman Catholic Archdiocese of Boston for an annulment of the marriage, claiming he was mentally incapable of entering into marriage at the time of his wedding. An annulment would have rendered the marriage void sacramentally (a church annulment does not change the legal legitimacy of a marriage) and allow Kennedy to marry Anne Elizabeth "Beth" Kelly (born April 3, 1957), a former staff member of his, in a Roman Catholic ceremony, as well as allow him to participate in other sacraments of the church, such as Holy Communion, not available to a divorced person who remarries. Rauch refused to agree to the annulment, and Kennedy married Beth in a non-Catholic civil ceremony on October 23, 1993.

The Boston Archdiocese initially granted Kennedy the annulment, which was discovered by Rauch only after the decision in 1996. Sheila, who is an Episcopalian, wrote a book Shattered Faith: A Woman's Struggle to Stop the Catholic Church from Annulling Her Marriage, explaining that she was opposed to the concept of annulment because it meant in Roman Catholic theology that the marriage had never actually existed, and claiming that the Kennedy family influence made it possible to unilaterally "cancel" a 12-year marriage. A tribunal decision in favor of annulment is automatically appealed, and the decision is not effective until a second, conforming, sentence is granted. Instead of allowing the appeal to take place in the United States, Rauch appealed directly to the Holy See. The original decision was overturned by the highest appellate tribunal of the Roman Catholic Church, the Roman Rota, in 2005. Rauch was not informed of the decision by the Boston Archdiocese until 2007. As the first decision was never confirmed, there was no time at which the Church declared the marriage to be null or gave Kennedy permission to remarry. Because the Rota was sitting as a second-instance appellate court, Kennedy could appeal against the decision to another Rotal panel.

See also
 Kennedy family tree

Notes

References

External links

Citizens Energy Corporation
Citizens Energy Corporation profile of Kennedy
 

|-

1952 births
Hijacking survivors
American people of Dutch descent
American people of Irish descent
Catholics from Massachusetts
Businesspeople from Boston
Joseph P
Living people
Politicians from Boston
Robert F. Kennedy
University of Massachusetts Boston alumni
Democratic Party members of the United States House of Representatives from Massachusetts
20th-century American politicians
20th-century American businesspeople
21st-century American businesspeople
Milton Academy alumni